Tok! Tok! Tok! Isang Milyon Pasok is a Philippine television game show broadcast by GMA Network. Hosted by Paolo Bediones, it premiered on May 27, 2007. The show returned for a second season on August 24, 2008 replacing Pinoy Idol. The show concluded on November 2, 2008 with a total of 63 episodes. It was replaced by Family Feud: Celebrity Edition in its timeslot.

Overview

Gameplay
3 pairs of contestants composed of a celebrity and the contestant itself are to play in the game. The contestant shall answer the questions given by the host. Every correct answer entitles him to "roll" the electronic die. The celebrity will act as the contestant's token in the life-sized gameboard composed of 18 doors. Each door has surprises and challenges inside (like crocodiles, chilis, etc.) that the celebrity must do in order for them to win the power stone which represents certain prizes. The power stone could be used to avoid the challenge but must be given back to the host (also the money). The first one who reaches door 18 goes to the jackpot round.

Ratings
According to AGB Nielsen Philippines' Mega Manila household television ratings, the final episode of Tok! Tok! Tok! Isang Milyon Pasok scored a 25.1% rating.

Accolades

References

External links
 

2007 Philippine television series debuts
2008 Philippine television series endings
Filipino-language television shows
GMA Network original programming
GMA Integrated News and Public Affairs shows
Philippine game shows